Sir Richard le Breton or Richard de Brito (fl. 1170) was one of the four knights who in 1170 murdered Thomas Becket, Archbishop of Canterbury.

Origins
Roger Brito is listed in the Domesday Book of 1086 as holding land under the overlordship of the Church of Long Sutton in Somerset, in which county the family was later seated at Sampford Brett (alias Sandford-Bret). During the reign of King Henry I (1100–1135) Sampford Brett was held by Simon le Bret, from the feudal barony of Dunster by military service of half a knight's fee. He served in the household of Henry II's brother William, Count of Poitou and was a near neighbour of the FitzUrse family of Williton in Somerset, a member of which family was another of the assassins of Thomas Becket. Simon le Bret had two sons: Richard Brito, one of the assassins of Thomas Becket and Edmund le Bret, who adopted the surname de Sandford from his seat. William the Conqueror granted a manor in the eastern part of the parish of Great Stambridge in Essex and another in Sanford in Somerset to a Norman named Auvrai Le Breton following the Norman conquest of England. A later relative, Simon Le Breton, had two sons, Richard and Edmund, who inherited their share of Sanford and Great Master Bridge. Both were part of the royal court of King Henry II; in particular Richard Le Breton was a close friend of the king's brother, Prince William.

Becket assassination
During the attack on Becket in 1170 by the four knights, Sir Reginald Fitzurse, Sir Hugh de Morville, Brito and Sir William de Tracy, Brito is said to have broken his sword when striking at Becket's head.

According to Edward Grim:

He shouted "Take that, for the love of my lord William, the king's brother!" when he delivered the fatal blow. It was believed by William's friends that the count had died of a broken heart after Thomas Becket refused to allow his marriage.

Aftermath
After the assassination the four knights fled to Scotland and from there to Knaresborough Castle in Yorkshire. All four were excommunicated by the Pope Alexander III at Easter in 1171 and ordered to undertake penitentiary pilgrimages to the Holy Land for 14 years.

Brito eventually retired to the island of Jersey. A ledger stone for one of the le Bretons of Jersey survives in St. Thomas's Church in Salisbury, Wiltshire. The Brett family of Whitestaunton in Somerset, are said by the Duchess of Cleveland to be descended from the Brettes of Sampford Brett, and are the ancestors of the present Brett family, Viscounts Esher.

References

12th-century English nobility
12th-century murderers
Anglo-Normans
English assassins
Norman warriors
English people of Breton descent
Medieval assassins
Medieval English knights
People temporarily excommunicated by the Catholic Church
Thomas Becket